The voltage-dependent N-type calcium channel subunit alpha-1B is a protein that in humans is encoded by the CACNA1B gene. The α1B protein, together with β and α2δ subunits forms N-type calcium channel (Cav2.2 channel) PMID 26386135. It is a R-type calcium channel.

References

Further reading

External links 
 

Human proteins